The 2021 New York Liberty season was the 25th season for the New York Liberty franchise of the WNBA. The Liberty opened the regular season on May 14, 2021 versus the Indiana Fever.

The Liberty started the season strong by winning their first three games and only losing two of their seven games in May.  However, June turned into a much worse month for the team as wins were book-ended by two losses.  The team finished 3–7 in June.  Things looked to be turning around in July as the Liberty won their first two games, but they lost their last two games of the month to take a 10–11 overall record into the Olympic break.  The post-Olympic break stretch of the season proved difficult for the Liberty.  They won their second game out of the break after losing their first, but then went on an eight game losing streak that stretched into September.  Going into the last game of the season, the Liberty were part of a three way tie for the eighth, and final playoff seed.  The Liberty defeated Washington and Los Angeles lost their final game, so the Liberty won the tiebreaker and qualified for the playoffs as the eighth seed with a final record of 12–20.

As the eighth seed, the Liberty played the fifth seeded Phoenix Mercury in Phoenix in the First Round.  The game was more competitive than many expected and it came down to the wire.  However, the Liberty were edged out 82–83 and their season came to an end.

Transactions

WNBA Draft

Trades/Roster Changes

Current roster

Game log

Preseason

|-
| 1
| May 3
| @ Connecticut
| colspan=4 | Scrimmage
| Mohegan Sun Arena0
| 0–0
|-
| 2
| May 11
| Dallas
| colspan=4 | Scrimmage
| Barclays Center
| 0–0

Regular season

|- style="background:#bbffbb;"
| 1
| May 14
| Indiana
| W 90–87
| Betnijah Laney (30)
| Sabrina Ionescu (6)
| Sabrina Ionescu (11)
| Barclays Center1,139
| 1–0
|- style="background:#bbffbb;"
| 2
| May 16
| @ Indiana
| W 73-65
| Betnijah Laney (20)
| Kylee Shook (7)
| LaneyWhitcombIonescu (4)
| Bankers Life FieldhouseNo Fans
| 2–0
|- style="background:#bbffbb;"
| 3
| May 18
| Minnesota
| W 86–75
| Sabrina Ionescu (26)
| Sabrina Ionescu (10)
| Sabrina Ionescu (12)
| Barclays Center815
| 3–0
|- style="background:#fcc;"
| 4
| May 21
| @ Washington
| L 72–101
| Betnijah Laney (20)
| Sami Whitcomb (7)
| IonescuLaney (5)
| Entertainment and Sports ArenaNo Fans
| 3–1
|- style="background:#bbffbb;"
| 5
| May 23
| @ Chicago
| W 93–85
| Betnijah Laney (20)
| Natasha Howard (7)
| Sabrina Ionescu (12)
| Wintrust Arena1,332
| 4–1
|- style="background:#bbffbb;"
| 6
| May 24
| Dallas
| W 88–81
| Betnijah Laney (26)
| Sabrina Ionescu (9)
| DiDi Richards (5)
| Barclays Center894
| 5–1
|- style="background:#fcc;"
| 7
| May 29
| Atlanta
| L 87–90
| Michaela Onyenwere (29)
| LaneyStokes (6)
| Betnijah Laney (11)
| Barclays Center1,235
| 5–2

|- style="background:#fcc;"
| 8
| June 3
| Las Vegas
| L 82–94
| Betnijah Laney (23)
| Kiah Stokes (13)
| Sabrina Ionescu (9)
| Barclays Center1,389
| 5–3
|- style="background:#fcc;"
| 9
| June 5
| @ Connecticut
| L 64–85
| Rebecca Allen (14)
| Sami Whitcomb (5)
| Betnijah Laney (6)
| Mohegan Sun Arena2,118
| 5–4
|- style="background:#bbffbb;"
| 10
| June 13
| @ Phoenix
| W 85–83
| Betnijah Laney (23)
| JonesLaney (7)
| Betnijah Laney (10)
| Phoenix Suns Arena4,476
| 6–4
|- style="background:#fcc;"
| 11
| June 15
| @ Las Vegas
| L 78–100
| Jazmine Jones (17)
| Kylee Shook (9)
| Betnijah Laney (6)
| Michelob Ultra Arena2,115
| 6–5
|- style="background:#fcc;"
| 12
| June 17
| @ Las Vegas
| L 76–103
| Betnijah Laney (20)
| Sami Whitcomb (6)
| Sami Whitcomb (5)
| Michelob Ultra ArenaNo Fans
| 6–6
|- style="background:#bbffbb;"
| 13
| June 20
| @ Los Angeles
| W 76–73
| Rebecca Allen (19)
| Sami Whitcomb (9)
| Betnijah Laney (5)
| Los Angeles Convention Center731
| 7–6
|- style="background:#fcc;"
| 14
| June 22
| Chicago
| L 72–92
| Betnijah Laney (18)
| Sabrina Ionescu (8)
| Sabrina Ionescu (7)
| Barclays Center1,419
| 7–7
|- style="background:#fcc;"
| 15
| June 24
| Chicago
| L 68–91
| Michaela Onyenwere (16)
| Kylee Shook (11)
| Sabrina Ionescu (5)
| Barclays Center2,148
| 7–8
|- style="background:#bbffbb;"
| 16
| June 26
| @ Atlanta
| W 101–78
| Sami Whitcomb (30)
| Kylee Shook (11)
| Sabrina Ionescu (8)
| Gateway Center Arena1,605
| 8–8
|- style="background:#fcc;"
| 17
| June 29
| @ Atlanta
| L 69–73
| Betnijah Laney (16)
| Kylee Shook (8)
| Betnijah Laney (7)
| Gateway Center Arena1,131
| 8–9

|- style="background:#bbffbb;"
| 18
| July 3
| Washington
| W 82–79
| Betnijah Laney (19)
| Sami Whitcomb (9)
| Sabrina Ionescu (5)
| Barclays Center1,615
| 9–9
|- style="background:#bbffbb;"
| 19
| July 5
| Dallas
| W 99–96
| Sami Whitcomb (26)
| Kylee Shook (8)
| Sabrina Ionescu (12)
| Barclays Center1,677
| 10–9
|- style="background:#fcc;"
| 20
| July 9
| @ Indiana
| L 69–82
| Betnijah Laney (23)
| Betnijah Laney (8)
| IonescuLaneyShook (4)
| Indiana Farmers ColiseumNo Fans
| 10–10
|- style="background:#fcc;"
| 21
| July 11
| Connecticut
| L 54–71
| Kylee Shook (16)
| IonescuWhitcomb (7)
| IonescuRichardsWhitcomb (3)
| Barclays Center
| 10–11

|- style="background:#fcc;"
| 22
| August 15
| @ Minnesota
| L 78–88
| Natasha Howard (30)
| Sabrina Ionescu (7)
| Sabrina Ionescu (6)
| Target Center3,534
| 10–12
|- style="background:#bbffbb;"
| 23
| August 18
| Seattle
| W 83–79
| AllenLaney (17)
| IonescuLaney (7)
| Betnijah Laney (8)
| Barclays Center2,103
| 11–12
|- style="background:#fcc;"
| 24
| August 20
| Seattle
| L 83–99
| Sami Whitcomb (26)
| Natasha Howard (13)
| Sami Whitcomb (8)
| Barclays Center3,889
| 11–13
|- style="background:#fcc;"
| 25
| August 22
| Los Angeles
| L 83–86
| HowardWhitcomb (17)
| Natasha Howard (11)
| Betnijah Laney (9)
| Barclays CenterN/A
| 11–14
|- style="background:#fcc;"
| 26
| August 25
| Phoenix
| L 79–106
| Betnijah Laney (20)
| AllenLaney (8)
| Sabrina Ionescu (7)
| Barclays Center1,872
| 11–15
|- style="background:#fcc;"
| 27
| August 27
| Phoenix
| L 64–80
| Natasha Howard (18)
| Sabrina Ionescu (10)
| Sabrina Ionescu (9)
| Barclays Center2,315
| 11–16
|- style="background:#fcc;"
| 28
| August 31
| @ Minnesota
| L 66–74
| IonescuLaney (17)
| Michaela Onyenwere (10)
| Sabrina Ionescu (6)
| Target Center3,221
| 11–17

|- style="background:#fcc;"
| 29
| September 2
| @ Seattle
| L 75–85
| Sabrina Ionescu (20)
| Betnijah Laney (7)
| Sabrina Ionescu (7)
| Angel of the Winds Arena3,592
| 11–18
|- style="background:#fcc;"
| 30
| September 11
| @ Dallas
| L 76–77
| Betnijah Laney (19)
| Natasha Howard (11)
| IonescuLaney (6)
| College Park Center2,888
| 11–19
|- style="background:#fcc;"
| 31
| September 15
| @ Connecticut
| L 69–98
| Natasha Howard (25)
| Natasha Howard (8)
| Sabrina Ionescu (5)
| Mohegan Sun Arena4,012
| 11–20
|- style="background:#bbffbb;"
| 32
| September 17
| Washington
| W 91–80
| Natasha Howard (24)
| Natasha Howard (10)
| Betnijah Laney (11)
| Barclays Center3,615
| 12–20

Playoffs 

|- style="background:#fcc;"
| 1
| September 23
| @ Phoenix
| 82–83
| Betnijah Laney (25)
| Natasha Howard (10)
| Sabrina Ionescu (11)
| Grand Canyon University Arena5,827
| 0–1

Standings

Playoffs

Awards and honors

Statistics

Source:

Regular Season

References

External links
The Official Site of the New York Liberty

New York Liberty seasons
New York Liberty
New York Liberty
New York Liberty